The true grasses (Poaceae) are one of the largest plant families, with around 12,000 species and roughly 800 genera. They contain, among others, the cereal crop species and other plants of economic importance, such as the bamboos, and several important weeds.

Grasses probably originated in the understory of tropical rainforests in the Late Cretaceous, but have since come to occupy a wide range of different habitats. Notably, they are the dominant species in grasslands, open habitats that cover around one fifth of the earth's terrestrial surface. The C4 photosynthetic pathway has evolved at least 22 times independently in the grasses; C4 species are more competitive than C3 plants in open habitats with high light intensity and warm temperatures.

The deeper relationships in the family have been resolved by recent molecular phylogenetic work. This has been translated into a modern classification which divides the grasses into twelve subfamilies and a number of tribes, with large tribes further divided into subtribes.

Anomochlooideae, Pharoideae and Puelioideae are early diverging lineages containing only a few species. Most of the diversity falls into the two big BOP and PACMAD clades, which each contain roughly half of the family's species. C4 lineages have only evolved in the PACMAD clade, whereas many lineages in the BOP clade have evolved adaptations to cold climate.

While the higher-level classification of the grasses is now relatively well understood, taxonomic efforts continue at the species and genera level, and with continuing phylogenetic research, a number of names is likely to change. The list of genera below is therefore likely to evolve with further study.

Genera

Acamptoclados
Achlaena
Achnatherum
Aciachne
Acidosasa
Acostia
Acrachne
Acritochaete
Acroceras
Actinocladum
Aegilops
Aegopogon
Aeluropus
Afrotrichloris
Agenium
Agnesia
Agropyron
Agropyropsis
Agrostis
Aira
Airopsis
Alexfloydia
Alloeochaete
Allolepis
Alloteropsis
Alopecurus
Alvimia
Amblyopyrum
Ammochloa
Ammophila
Ampelodesmos
Amphibromus
Amphicarpum
Amphipogon
Anadelphia
Ancistrachne
Ancistragrostis
Andropogon
Andropterum
Anemanthele
Aniselytron
Anisopogon
Anomochloa
Anthaenantiopsis
Anthaenantia
Anthephora
Anthochloa
Anthoxanthum
Antinoria
Apera
Aphanelytrum
Apluda
Apochiton
Apoclada
Apocopis
Arberella
Arctagrostis
Arctophila
Aristida
Arrhenatherum
Arthragrostis
Arthraxon
Arthropogon
Arthrostylidium
Arundinaria
Arundinella
Arundo
Arundoclaytonia
Asthenochloa
Astrebla
Athroostachys
Atractantha
Aulonemia
Australopyrum
Austrochloris
Austrodanthonia
Austrofestuca
Austrostipa
Avellinia
Avena
Axonopus
Bambusa
Baptorhachis
Bealia
Beckeropsis
Beckmannia
Bellardiochloa
Bewsia
Bhidea
Blepharidachne
Blepharoneuron
Boissiera
Boivinella
Borinda
Bothriochloa
Bouteloua
Brachiaria
Brachyachne
Brachychloa
Brachyelytrum
Brachypodium
Briza
Bromuniola
Bromus
Brylkinia
Buchloe
Buchlomimus
Buergersiochloa
Calamagrostis
Calamovilfa
Calderonella
Calosteca
Calyptochloa
Camusiella
Capillipedium
Castellia
Catabrosa
Catabrosella
Catalepis
Catapodium
Cathestecum
Cenchrus
Centotheca
Centrochloa
Centropodia
Cephalostachyum
Chaboissaea
Chaetium
Chaetobromus
Chaetopoa
Chaetopogon
Chaetostichium
Chamaeraphis
Chandrasekharania
Chasechloa
Chasmanthium
Chasmopodium
Chevalierella
Chikusichloa
Chimonobambusa
Chionachne
Chionochloa
Chloachne
Chloris
Chlorocalymma
Chrysochloa
Chrysopogon
Chumsriella
Chusquea
Cinna
Cladoraphis
Clausospicula
Cleistachne
Cleistochloa
Cliffordiochloa
Cockaynea
Coelachne
Coelachyropsis
Coelachyrum
Coelorachis
Coix
Colanthelia
Coleanthus
Colpodium
Commelinidium
Cornucopiae
Cortaderia
Corynephorus
Cottea
Craspedorhachis
Crinipes
Crithopsis
Crypsis
Cryptochloa
Ctenium
Ctenopsis
Cutandia
Cyathopus
Cyclostachya
Cymbopogon
Cymbosetaria
Cynodon
Cynosurus
Cyperochloa
Cyphochlaena
Cypholepis
Cyrtococcum
Dactylis
Dactyloctenium
Daknopholis
Dallwatsonia
Danthonia
Danthoniastrum
Danthonidium
Danthoniopsis
Dasyochloa
Dasypoa
Dasypyrum
Davidsea
Decaryella
Decaryochloa
Dendrocalamus
Dendrochloa
Deschampsia
Desmazeria
Desmostachya
Deyeuxia
Diandrochloa
Diandrolyra
Diandrostachya
Diarrhena
Dichaetaria
Dichanthelium
Dichanthium
Dichelachne
Diectomis
Dielsiochloa
Digastrium
Digitaria
Digitariopsis
Dignathia
Diheteropogon
Dilophotriche
Dimeria
Dimorphochloa
Dinebra
Dinochloa
Diplachne
Diplopogon
Dissanthelium
Dissochondrus
Distichlis
Drake-Brockmania
Dregeochloa
Drepanostachyum
Dryopoa
Dupontia
Duthiea
Dybowskia
Eccoilopus
Eccoptocarpha
Echinaria
Echinochloa
Echinolaena
Echinopogon
Ectrosia
Ectrosiopsis
Ehrharta
Ekmanochloa
Eleusine
Elionurus
Elymandra
Elymus
Elytrigia
Elytrophorus
Elytrostachys
Enneapogon
Enteropogon
Entolasia
Entoplocamia
Eragrostiella
Eragrostis
Eremium
Eremochloa
Eremopoa
Eremopogon
Eremopyrum
Eriachne
Erianthecium
Erianthus
Eriochloa
Eriochrysis
Erioneuron
Euclasta
Eulalia
Eulaliopsis
Eustachys
Euthryptochloa
Exotheca
Fargesia
Farrago
Fasciculochloa
Festuca
Festucella
Festucopsis
Filgueirasia
Fingerhuthia
Froesiochloa
Garnotia
Gastridium
Gaudinia
Gaudinopsis
Germainia
Gerritea
Gigantochloa
Gilgiochloa
Glaziophyton
Glyceria
Glyphochloa
Gouinia
Gouldochloa
Graphephorum
Greslania
Griffithsochloa
Guaduella
Gymnachne
Gymnopogon
Gynerium
Habrochloa
Hackelochloa
Hainardia
Hakonechloa
Halopyrum
Harpachne
Harpochloa
Helictotrichon
Helleria
Hemarthria
Hemisorghum
Henrardia
Hesperostipa
Heterachne
Heteranthelium
Heteranthoecia
Heterocarpha
Heteropholis
Heteropogon
Hibanobambusa
Hickelia
Hierochloe
Hilaria
Hitchcockella
Holcolemma
Holcus
Homolepis
Homopholis
Homozeugos
Hookerochloa
Hordelymus
Hordeum
Hubbardia
Hubbardochloa
Humbertochloa
Hyalopoa
Hydrochloa
Hydrothauma
Hygrochloa
Hygroryza
Hylebates
Hymenachne
Hyparrhenia
Hyperthelia
Hypogynium
Hypseochloa
Hystrix
Ichnanthus
Imperata
Indocalamus
Indopoa
Indosasa
Isachne
Isalus
Ischaemum
Ischnochloa
Ischnurus
Iseilema
Ixophorus
Jansenella
Jardinea
Jouvea
Joycea
Kampochloa
Kaokochloa
Karroochloa
Kengia
Kengyilia
Kerriochloa
Koeleria
Lagurus
Lamarckia
Lamprothyrsus
Lasiacis
Lasiorhachis
Lasiurus
Lecomtella
Leersia
Lepargochloa
Leptagrostis
Leptaspis
Leptocarydion
Leptochloa
Leptochloris
Leptocoryphium
Leptoloma
Leptosaccharum
Leptothrium
Lepturella
Lepturidium
Lepturopetium
Lepturus
Leucophrys
Leucopoa
Leymus
Libyella
Limnas
Limnodea
Limnopoa
Lindbergella
Linkagrostis
Lintonia
Lithachne
Littledalea
Loliolum
Lolium
Lombardochloa
Lophacme
Lophatherum
Lopholepis
Lophopogon
Lophopyrum
Lorenzochloa
Loudetia
Loudetiopsis
Louisiella
Loxodera
Luziola
Lycochloa
Lycurus
Lygeum
Maclurolyra
Maillea
Malacurus
Maltebrunia
Manisuris
Megalachne
Megaloprotachne
Megastachya
Melanocenchris
Melica
Melinis
Melocalamus
Melocanna
Merostachys
Merxmuellera
Mesosetum
Metasasa
Metcalfia
Mibora
Micraira
Microbriza
Microcalamus
Microchloa
Microlaena
Micropyropsis
Micropyrum
Microstegium
Mildbraediochloa
Milium
Miscanthidium
Miscanthus
Mnesithea
Mniochloa 
Molineriella 
Molinia
Moliniopsis
Monachather
Monanthochloe
Monelytrum
Monium
Monocladus
Monocymbium
Monodia
Mosdenia
Muhlenbergia
Mullerochloa
Munroa
Myriocladus
Myriostachya
Narduroides
Nardus
Narenga
Nassella
Nastus
Neeragrostis
Neesiochloa
Nematopoa
Neobouteloua
Neohouzeaua
Neostapfia
Neostapfiella
Nephelochloa
Neurachne
Neurolepis
Neyraudia
Notochloe
Notodanthonia
Ochlandra
Ochthochloa
Odontelytrum
Odyssea
Olmeca
Olyra
Ophiochloa
Ophiuros
Opizia
Oplismenopsis
Oplismenus
Orcuttia
Oreobambos
Oreochloa
Orinus
Oropetium
Ortachne
Orthoclada
Oryza
Oryzidium
Oryzopsis
Otachyrium
Otatea
Ottochloa
Oxychloris
Oxyrhachis
Oxytenanthera
Panicum
Pappophorum
Parafestuca
Parahyparrhenia
Paraneurachne
Parapholis
Paratheria
Parectenium
Pariana
Parodiolyra
Pascopyrum
Paspalidium
Paspalum
Patzkea
Pennisetum
Pentameris
Pentapogon
Pentarrhaphis
Pentaschistis
Pereilema
Periballia
Peridictyon
Perotis
Perrierbambus
Perulifera
Peyritschia
Phacelurus
Phaenanthoecium
Phaenosperma
Phalaris
Pharus
Pheidochloa
Phippsia
Phleum
Pholiurus
Phragmites
Phyllorachis
Phyllostachys
Pilgerochloa
Piptatherum
Piptochaetium
Piptophyllum
Piresia
Piresiella
Plagiantha
Plagiosetum
Planichloa
Plectrachne
Pleiadelphia
Pleioblastus
Pleuropogon
Plinthanthesis
Poa
Pobeguinea
Podophorus
Poecilostachys
Pogonachne
Pogonarthria
Pogonatherum
Pogoneura
Pogonochloa
Pohlidium
Poidium
Polevansia
Polliniopsis
Polypogon
Polytoca
Polytrias
Pommereulla
Porteresia
Potamophila
Pringleochloa
Prionanthium
Prosphytochloa
Psammagrostis
Psammochloa
Psathyrostachys
Pseudanthistiria
Pseudarrhenatherum
Pseudechinolaena
Pseudobromus
Pseudochaetochloa
Pseudocoix
Pseudodanthonia
Pseudodichanthium
Pseudopentameris
Pseudophleum
Pseudopogonatherum
Pseudoraphis
Pseudoroegneria
Pseudosasa
Pseudosorghum
Pseudostachyum
Pseudovossia
Pseudoxytenanthera
Pseudozoysia
Psilathera
Psilolemma
Psilurus
Pterochloris
Ptilagrostis
Puccinellia
Puelia
Racemobambos
Raddia
Raddiella
Ratzeburgia
Redfieldia
Reederochloa
Rehia
Reimarochloa
Reitzia
Relchela
Rendlia
Renvoizea
Reynaudia
Rhipidocladum
Rhizocephalus
Rhomboelytrum
Rhynchelytrum
Rhynchoryza
Rhytachne
Richardsiella
Robynsiochloa
Rottboellia
Rytidosperma
Saccharum
Sacciolepis
Sartidia
Sasa
Sasaella
Sasamorpha
Saugetia
Schaffnerella
Schedonnardus
Schenckochloa
Schismus
Schizachne
Schizachyrium
Schizostachyum
Schmidtia
Schoenefeldia
Sclerachne
Sclerochloa
Sclerodactylon
Scleropogon
Sclerostachya
Scolochloa
Scribneria
Scrotochloa
Scutachne
Secale
Sehima
Semiarundinaria
Sesleria
Sesleriella
Setaria
Setariopsis
Shibataea
Silentvalleya
Simplicia
Sinarundinaria
Sinobambusa
Sinochasea
Sitanion
Snowdenia
Soderstromia
Soejatmia
Sohnsia
Sorghastrum
Sorghum
Spartina
Spartochloa
Spathia
Sphaerobambos
Sphaerocaryum
Spheneria
Sphenopholis
Sphenopus
Spinifex
Spodiopogon
Sporobolus
Steinchisma
Steirachne
Stenotaphrum
Stephanachne
Stereochlaena
Steyermarkochloa
Stiburus
Stilpnophleum
Stipa
Stipagrostis
Streblochaete
Streptochaeta
Streptogyna
Streptolophus
Streptostachys
Styppeiochloa
Sucrea
Suddia
Swallenia
Swallenochloa
Symplectrodia
Taeniatherum
Taeniorhachis
Tarigidia
Tatianyx
Teinostachyum
Tetrachaete
Tetrachne
Tetrapogon
Tetrarrhena
Thamnocalamus
Thaumastochloa
Thelepogon
Thellungia
Themeda
Thinopyrum
Thrasya
Thrasyopsis
Thuarea
Thyridachne
Thyridolepis
Thyrsia
Thyrsostachys
Thysanolaena
Torreyochloa
Tovarochloa
Trachypogon
Trachys
Tragus
Tribolium
Tricholaena
Trichoneura
Trichopteryx
Tridens
Trikeraia
Trilobachne
Triniochloa
Triodia
Triplachne
Triplasis
Triplopogon
Tripogon
Tripsacum
Triraphis
Triscenia
Trisetum
Tristachya
Triticum
Tuctoria
Uniola
Uranthoecium
Urelytrum
Urochloa
Urochondra
Vahlodea
Vaseyochloa
Ventenata
Vetiveria
Vietnamochloa
Vietnamosasa
Viguierella
Vossia
Vulpia
Vulpiella
Walwhalleya
Wangenheimia
Whiteochloa
Willkommia
Xerochloa
Yakirra
Ystia
Yushania
Yvesia
Zea
Zenkeria
Zeugites
Zingeria
Zizania
Zizaniopsis
Zonotriche
Zotovia
Zoysia
Zygochloa

References 

.
Poaceae
Poaceae
Poaceae genera
Poaceae